Oceola may refer to the following places in the United States:

 Oceola, Ohio
 Oceola Township, Michigan

See also 
 Osceola (disambiguation)